South Head may mean:

 The south head of Port Jackson, New South Wales, Australia; one of the Sydney Heads
 South Head at the entrance to Wick Bay on the northeast coast of Scotland
 South Head is also the south part of The Knippla Island on the Swedish west coast, well known because of South Head Blues Band, which started their career there
 South Head, a hill in the Peak District of England